Grenada Village is one of the northern suburbs of Wellington, New Zealand, between   Paparangi and Grenada North.

In 1991 a new landfill was opened in Grenada, with direct access via an overbridge to the adjacent motorway. A road extension would give Newlands and Paparangi access to the motorway, but the Grenada Village Progressive Association was concerned about any increase in traffic and car speeds. From 1994 the  WCC consulted with residents, and in 2009 the "Mark Avenue Extension" connecting the two roads was opened by the Mayor. The new subdivision was called Hunter Hills, and future roads would give access to the Lincolnshire Farms development.

History  
Grenada, originally known as the McMillan Block and then as Grenada Village, was initially planned by Paparangi Properties in 1975. It was then taken over by Grenada Estates, who started development in 1977, with large scale developments including  a school and shopping centre planned. Development slowed in the 1980s with the rise in oil prices, but continued steadily over the next twenty years.  The suburb was named after Grenada in the Caribbean, and many streets are named after Caribbean islands.

Demographics 

Grenada had a population of 1,704 at the 2018 New Zealand census, an increase of 456 people (36.5%) since the 2013 census, and an increase of 723 people (73.7%) since the 2006 census. There were 561 households. There were 843 males and 861 females, giving a sex ratio of 0.98 males per female. The median age was 34.9 years (compared with 37.4 years nationally), with 405 people (23.8%) aged under 15 years, 291 (17.1%) aged 15 to 29, 909 (53.3%) aged 30 to 64, and 96 (5.6%) aged 65 or older.

Ethnicities were 61.3% European/Pākehā, 8.8% Māori, 4.9% Pacific peoples, 31.2% Asian, and 5.3% other ethnicities (totals add to more than 100% since people could identify with multiple ethnicities).

The proportion of people born overseas was 35.2%, compared with 27.1% nationally.

Although some people objected to giving their religion, 45.8% had no religion, 39.3% were Christian, 4.6% were Hindu, 1.6% were Muslim, 2.1% were Buddhist and 1.6% had other religions.

Of those at least 15 years old, 480 (37.0%) people had a bachelor or higher degree, and 93 (7.2%) people had no formal qualifications. The median income was $52,200, compared with $31,800 nationally. The employment status of those at least 15 was that 846 (65.1%) people were employed full-time, 159 (12.2%) were part-time, and 30 (2.3%) were unemployed.

External links
Russell Properties: Hunter's Hill subdivision (commercial website)

References

Suburbs of Wellington City